Jałówka  is a village in the administrative district of Gmina Michałowo, within Białystok County, Podlaskie Voivodeship, in north-eastern Poland, close to the border with Belarus.

It has Eastern Orthodox and Roman Catholic churches.

References

Villages in Białystok County
Volkovyssky Uyezd
Białystok Voivodeship (1919–1939)